Henry Victor Gaston (born January 15, 1943) is an American politician. He was the Acting Speaker of the Alabama House of Representatives.  He is also the Dean of Alabama House Republicans.

Biography

Early life
Victor Gaston was born on January 15, 1943. He received a B.S. from the University of Southern Mississippi, an M.A. from the University of South Alabama, and Ed.D. from Auburn University.

Career
He worked as a school administrator and timber farmer.

Alabama House of Representatives
Gaston was first elected to represent the 100th district in the Alabama House of Representatives in 1982. He was elected by his colleagues to serve as Speaker Pro Tempore in December 2010 for a special session after the Republicans gained a majority during the 2010 mid-term elections. He was re-elected to full four-year terms in 2011 and 2015.

Acting Speaker of the House
Gaston became the Acting Speaker of the Alabama House of House per state law and House rules after incumbent Speaker Mike Hubbard was convicted on 12 felony counts of public corruption. Alabama law requires any public office holder immediately removed from office if they have been convicted of a felony.

Gaston served as Acting Speaker until the full House reconvened to elect Mac McCutcheon as the permanent Speaker. With the chamber adjourned sine die for the rest of 2016, Gov. Robert J. Bentley would have to call a special session or the election of a permanent Speaker would have to wait until the House reconvenes in February 2017.

In June 2016, Gaston announced that he would seek the job of Speaker on a permanent basis.

Public service
He also sits on the Advisory Council for the Assistance League of Mobile, the American Legislative Exchange Council (ALEC), the State Building Commission, and the Southwest Alabama division of the National Mental Health Association. He is a member of Phi Delta Kappa, and a former member of the White House Commission on Presidential Scholars and the United States Energy Council. Additionally, he serves on the Boards of Volunteers of America, the Penelope House, Home of Grace for Women, Mobile Mental Health Center, the Mobile Association of Retarded Citizens, and Alabama 4-H Club Foundation.

Personal life
He is married with two sons. He serves as a deacon at the Springhill Baptist Church in Mobile, Alabama, which was founded in 1949.

References

|-

1943 births
21st-century American politicians
Auburn University alumni
Baptists from Alabama
Living people
Republican Party members of the Alabama House of Representatives
Speakers of the Alabama House of Representatives
University of South Alabama alumni
University of Southern Mississippi alumni